(December 31, 1971 – October 19, 1997) was a Japanese Formula 3 Championship race car driver. He died during the season-ending Japanese Formula 3 Championship race at Fuji on October 19, 1997.

During the early stages of the race, a crash happened in front of Yokoyama between the leaders. There, Dutch racer Tom Coronel got clipped from behind trying to hold off Japanese racer Shigekazu Wakisaka. Wakisaka's car climbed over the top of Coronel's, and one of Wakisaka's tires hit the side of Coronel's helmet before Wakisaka flipped over in the sandpit. Neither driver was injured in the crash, though Coronel had a tire mark on his helmet.

This accident brought out a full course caution and the remaining drivers were told to slow down for the safety car. On the front stretch, Yokoyama was behind a group of cars that slowed down waiting for the safety car to come out. However, Yokoyama was approaching the field too fast and before he could hit the brakes, he hit one car and became airborne. The force of the impact sent Yokoyama into a signboard; the car disintegrated and then fell to the ground. Yokoyama died instantly from severe injuries sustained in the crash and the organizers decided to cancel the rest of the race. He was 25 years old.

References

1971 births
1997 deaths
Filmed deaths in motorsport
Japanese racing drivers
Racing drivers who died while racing
Sport deaths in Japan
People from Gunma Prefecture
Sportspeople from Gunma Prefecture
People from Ōta, Gunma
TOM'S drivers
British Formula Three Championship drivers